Loreto Department is a department of Argentina in Santiago del Estero Province.  The capital city of the department is Loreto.

Villages
 

Ayuncha
Tío Pozo

References

Departments of Santiago del Estero Province